Serhiy Timokhov (born 9 May 1972) is a Ukrainian Olympics sailor that participated in the 2000 Summer Olympics.

References

1972 births
Living people
Ukrainian male sailors (sport)
Olympic sailors of Ukraine
Sailors at the 2000 Summer Olympics – Soling
European Champions Soling
Soling class world champions